The HD Pentax-D FA* 85mm f/1.4 SDM AW lens is a professional short telephoto prime lens for the Pentax K-mount. The lens was officially announced on February 26, 2019, launched on June 25, 2020 and announced to be first shipped on June 26, 2020.

Notable features include the company's second in-house ring-type ultrasonic motor with 1.3x the torque of the Pentax D FA* 50mm lens for fast autofocus, full dust and water resistance with eight sealings and an advanced optical formula for high-resolution images with smooth bokeh.

Notes

References

External links 
Product page Ricoh Imaging UK
Product page Ricoh Imaging Global
Special Content Site Ricoh Imaging Global
Development Update - HD PENTAX-D FA★85mmF1.4 SDM AW Ricoh Imaging UK
RICOH develops new-generation, high-performance Star-series lens for digital SLR cameras, the HD PENTAX-D FA★85mmF1.4ED SDM AW Ricoh Imaging Global

85
Camera lenses introduced in 2020